The Mori–Zwanzig formalism, named after the physicists Hajime Mori and Robert Zwanzig, is a method of statistical physics. It allows the splitting of the dynamics of a system into a relevant and an irrelevant part using projection operators, which helps to find closed equations of motion for the relevant part. It is used e.g. in fluid mechanics or condensed matter physics.

Idea 
Macroscopic systems with a large number of microscopic degrees of freedom are often well described by a small number of relevant variables, for example the magnetization in a system of spins. The Mori–Zwanzig formalism allows the finding of macroscopic equations that only depend on the relevant variables based on microscopic equations of motion of a system, which are usually determined by the Hamiltonian. The irrelevant part appears in the equations as noise. The formalism does not determine what the relevant variables are, these can typically be obtained from the properties of the system.

The observables describing the system form a Hilbert space. The projection operator then projects the dynamics onto the subspace spanned by the relevant variables.  The irrelevant part of the dynamics then depends on the observables that are orthogonal to the relevant variables. A correlation function is used as a scalar product, which is why the formalism can also be used for analyzing the dynamics of correlation functions.

Derivation 
A not explicitly time-dependent observable  obeys the Heisenberg equation of motion

where the Liouville operator  is defined using the commutator   in the quantum case and using the Poisson bracket  in the classical case. We assume here that the Hamiltonian does not have explicit time-dependence. The derivation can also be generalized towards time-dependent Hamiltonians.  This equation is formally solved by

The projection operator acting on an observable  is defined as

The Mori product, a generalization of the usual correlation function, is typically used for this scalar product. For observables , it is defined as

It is chosen in such a way that it can be written as a function of the relevant variables only, but is a good approximation for the actual density, in particular such that it gives the correct mean values.

Now, we apply the operator identity

to

Using the projection operator introduced above and the definitions

(frequency matrix),

(random force) and

(memory function), the result can be written as

This is an equation of motion for the observable , which depends on its value at the current time , the value at previous times (memory term) and the random force (noise, depends on the part of the dynamics that is orthogonal to ).

Markovian approximation 
The equation derived above is typically difficult to solve due to the convolution term. Since we are typically interested in slow macroscopic variables changing timescales much larger than the microscopic noise, this has the effect of integrating over an infinite time limit while disregarding the lag in the convolution.
, 
where
.

Generalizations 
For larger deviations from thermodynamic equilibrium, the more general form of the Mori–Zwanzig formalism is used, from which the previous results can be obtained through a linearization.  In this case, the Hamiltonian has explicit time-dependence. In this case, the transport equation for a variable
,
, 
where
,
,

and
.
We have used the time-ordered exponential

and the time-dependent projection operator

These equations can also be re-written using a generalization of the Mori product.  Further generalizations can be used to apply the formalism to time-dependent Hamiltonians   and arbitrary dynamical systems

See also 
 Nakajima–Zwanzig equation
 Zwanzig projection operator

Notes

References 

 Hermann Grabert Projection operator techniques in nonequilibrium statistical mechanics, Springer Tracts in Modern Physics, Band 95, 1982
 Robert Zwanzig Nonequilibrium Statistical Mechanics 3rd ed., Oxford University Press, New York, 2001

Statistical mechanics